Freeport Tortuga was a free port project by Dupont Caribbean Inc. of Texas, which began construction in 1971 based upon a 99-year contract with the government of Haiti. The location of the freeport was the old buccaneer stronghold of Tortuga island located some 10 miles off the north coast of the main Haitian island of Hispaniola, which is also shared by the Dominican Republic. Freeport Tortuga ended with its expropriation by the Haitian government in 1974.

Origin of the freeport

In 1967, during the time that Don Pierson of Eastland, Texas was attempting to lease a radio broadcasting ship that had been the former homes of Swinging Radio England and Britain Radio off the coast of England, he received a response from the Ambassador for Haiti in Washington, DC. Don Pierson's original plan was to lease or sell the ship to the government of Haiti for it to establish two powerful 50 kW commercial radio stations.

Dupont Caribbean Inc.
This offer emerged into a plan to develop the island of Tortuga as a freeport and he was asked to assist the government of Haiti to encourage business investment in that poverty-stricken land. This privately financed, privately managed free enterprise zone became a reality in 1971 when Haitian dictator François Duvalier (known as "Papa Doc") and the Haitian government entered into a 99-year contract with Don Pierson's company called Dupont Caribbean Inc. This contract provided for the establishment of Freeport Tortuga.

Construction
Within 18 months Don Pierson succeeded in building the island's first airport, a loading dock for seagoing vessels, a rudimentary water and sewer system, an electricity generating facility, and six miles of paved road. Of equal importance, the project created jobs for some 400 previously unemployed Haitians and resulted in the establishment of a small school to teach various job skills. During this period he also became Honorary Consul of the Republic of Haiti to Texas from 1969 through 1974.

Expropriation
The project came to abrupt end in 1974 when, after it was announced that Gulf Oil Corporation was contemplating investing more than $300 million to build a resort on the island, the government of Jean-Claude Duvalier (known as "Baby Doc"), summarily expropriated the project, resulting in its collapse.

See also
Wonderful Radio London - Don Pierson's first offshore radio station.
Swinging Radio England and Britain Radio - Don Pierson's 2nd and 3rd offshore radio stations on board the former MV Olga Patricia. It was the process of leasing of this ship that opened the door to the project on Tortuga.

History of Haiti
Tortuga (Haiti)